In algebraic topology, a branch of mathematics, the excision theorem is a theorem about relative homology and one of the Eilenberg–Steenrod axioms.

This assists in computation of singular homology groups, as sometimes after excising an appropriately chosen subspace we obtain something easier to compute.

Theorem

Statement  
If  are as above, we say that  can be excised if the inclusion map of the pair  into  induces an isomorphism on the relative homologies: 

Often, subspaces that do not satisfy this containment criterion still can be excised—it suffices to be able to find a deformation retract of the subspaces onto subspaces that do satisfy it.

Proof Sketch 
The proof of the excision theorem is quite intuitive, though the details are rather involved. This process leaves the original homology class of the chain unchanged (this says the subdivision operator is chain homotopic to the identity map on homology).
In the relative homology  , then, this says all the terms contained entirely in the interior of  can be dropped without affecting the homology class of the cycle. This allows us to show that the inclusion map is an isomorphism, as each relative cycle is  equivalent to one that avoids  entirely.

Applications

Eilenberg–Steenrod Axioms 

The excision theorem is taken to be one of the Eilenberg–Steenrod Axioms.

Mayer-Vietoris Sequences 

The Mayer–Vietoris sequence may be derived with a combination of excision theorem and the long-exact sequence.

See also 
Homotopy excision theorem

References

Bibliography
 Joseph J. Rotman, An Introduction to Algebraic Topology, Springer-Verlag, 
 Allen Hatcher, Algebraic Topology. Cambridge University Press, Cambridge, 2002.

Homology theory
Theorems in topology